A list of films produced by the Marathi language film industry based in Maharashtra in the year 1928.

1928 Releases
A list of Marathi films released in 1928.

References

External links
Gomolo - 

Lists of 1928 films by country or language
1928
1928 in Indian cinema